Road 98 is a road in south-eastern Iran connecting Guatr to Chabahar and Jask and to Bandarabbas via Road 91.

References

External links 

 Iran road map on Young Journalists Club

Roads in Iran